Oliver Levick (13 June 1899 – 1965) was an English professional footballer who played as a half-back in the Football League for Sheffield Wednesday and Stockport County and in non-League football for Woodhouse, York City and  Boston United.

References

1899 births
1965 deaths
Footballers from Sheffield
English footballers
Association football midfielders
Woodhouse F.C. players
Sheffield Wednesday F.C. players
Stockport County F.C. players
York City F.C. players
Boston United F.C. players
English Football League players
Midland Football League players
Date of death missing